This is a list of seasons completed by the American International College men's ice hockey team.  The list documents the season-by-season records of the Yellow Jackets from 1948 to present, including postseason results.

AIC has won 3 conference championships, one as a Division I program, and made their first national tournament appearance in 2019.

Season-by-season results
Note: GP = Games played, W = Wins, L = Losses, T = Ties

* Winning percentage is used when conference schedules are unbalanced.

References

 
Lists of college men's ice hockey seasons in the United States
American International Yellow Jackets ice hockey seasons